Insolent and in Love is a 1948 German romantic comedy film directed by Hans Schweikart and starring Johannes Heesters, Gabriele Reismüller and Charlott Daudert. It was shot at the Bavaria Studios in Munich. The film's sets were designed by the art director Hans Sohnle. The film was made in 1944 but it did not receive a national release until 1948. In 1950 it was distributed in Austria by Sascha Film.

Cast
 Johannes Heesters as Dr. Peter Schild, Ingenieur
 Gabriele Reismüller as Clarisse Pernrieder
 Charlott Daudert as Isolde, Tänzerin
 Carl-Heinz Schroth as Cyrus Kracker, Schauspieler
 Paul Kemp as Der alte Pernrieder, Clarissas Großvater
 Paul Dahlke as Hennemann, Diener und Chauffeur
 Melanie Horeschowsky as Klara Pernrieder
 Ernst Waldow as Schleemann, Onkel von Peter Schild
Erna Sellmer as Frau Wiedehopf
 Paul Westermeier as Walter Lemke, Boxer
 Franz Schafheitlin as Justus Pernrieder, Fabrikant
 Ernst Legal as Nordboden, Besitzer des Detektivbüros
 Victor Janson as Hausknecht
 Rudolf Reiff as Besitzer des Landhotels
 Ernst Dernburg as Arzt
 Angelo Ferrari as Italienischer Reisender
 Alexander Fischer-Marich as Alter Kellner
 Emmy Flemmich as Marie, Köchin
 Rosemarie Grosser as Dienstmädchen
 Willem Holsboer as Herr Wiedehopf
 Alois Krüger
 Else Kündinger as Ältere Hausbewohnerin
 Ludwig Meier as Hansi, Kind
 Else Mereny
 Hanns Olsen
 Hans Paetsch as Ober
 Werner Pledath as Gast
 Eva Wagner as Mariele, Kind
 Inge Weigand as Zigarettenmädchen
 Eduard Wenck as Autobusfahrgast
 Arthur Wiesner as Gepäckträger

See also
 Überläufer

References

Bibliography 
 Eric Rentschler. German Film & Literature. Routledge, 2013.

External links 
 

1948 films
1948 romantic comedy films
German romantic comedy films
1940s German-language films
Films directed by Hans Schweikart
Films shot at Bavaria Studios
Films with screenplays by Ernst von Salomon
Bavaria Film films
German black-and-white films
1940s German films